Un Drame Musical Instantané, since its creation in 1976, featuring Jean-Jacques Birgé, Bernard Vitet and Francis Gorgé, has decided to promote collective musical creation, co-signing their albums, which they consider as artworks in themselves, or their live shows which they try to renew every time they play.

History
They borrowed their sources from rock (synthesizer player Birgé and guitarist Gorgé, both authors of the album, Défense de); jazz (trumpeter Vitet who founded the first free jazz band in France, together with François Tusques, as well as Michel Portal who played with many American and European jazzmen); classical modern music; as well as movies or world news; they were the first in France to give a new impetus to live music on silent movies.

Twenty four creations were in their repertoire, among which were Caligari by Robert Wiene, La glace à trois faces and La chute de la Maison Usher by Jean Epstein, The passion of Joan of Arc by Carl Dreyer, Man with a Movie Camera by Dziga Vertov, and L'argent by Marcel L'Herbier. After having improvised freely for many years, they led a fifteen piece orchestra from 1981 to 1986, and since 1989 they have produced multimedia shows (live video remix on a giant screen, fireworks, choreographies), but their most convincing musical theater was mainly audio, which they have called "blind cinema". The Drame used to mix acoustic and electronic instruments in real time as well as original instruments built by Vitet (a reed trumpet, a multiphonic French horn, a variable tension double-bass, a giant balafon with frying pans and flower pots keyboard, a fire organ, plexiglas flutes, etc.)

After Francis Gorgé has left the band in 1992, Birgé and Vitet went on recording and producing with other musicians close to the "family" such as percussionist, Gérard Siracusa, or multi-instrumentalist, Hélène Sage. Un Drame Musical Instantané which has always remain independent (they have always owned their own recording studio and record label GRRR) stopped its activities in 2008, Birgé remaining the only one on the music scene. And Vitet died on July 3, 2013.

However, Un Drame Musical Instantané has come back on stage in 2014, featuring Birgé, Gorgé, Sage, plus several guests, and Birgé Gorgé got back together with writer Dominique Meens in 2022.

Discography
 Très toxique (GRRR / also on Toxic Rice, Psych.KG, D) 1976 (issued 2023)
 Trop d'adrénaline nuit (GRRR, France), 1977 (issued 1979) - CD reissue+bonus+DVD (Mio, Israel), 2001 - LP reissue+DVD (Wah-Wah, Spain), 2013
 Rideau ! (GRRR), 1980 - CD reissue+bonus (Klang Galerie, Austria), 2017
 Pas de cadeau in 18 surprises pour Noël (DeQualité, France), 1981
 À travail égal salaire égal, for orchestra (GRRR), 1982 - CD reissue+bonus (Klang Galerie, Austria), 2018
 Under The Channel in In Fractured Silence (United Dairies, GB), 1983
 Les bons contes font les bons amis, for orchestra (GRRR), 1983 - CD reissue+bonus (Klang Galerie, Austria), 2022
 L'uniforme in mc Unique (France), 1984
 L'homme à la caméra, for orchestra (GRRR), 1984 - bundle with LP remix by Jorge Velez, Le Tone, Eltron John, Tuff Sherm (DDD, France), 2017 - CD reissue+bonus (Klang Galerie, Austria), 2020
 Das Kabinett des Doktor Caligari in mc Bad Alchemy (Germany), 1985
 Carnage, incl. La Bourse et la vie, N.O.P. dir. Yves Prin (GRRR), 1985 - CD reissue+bonus (Klang Galerie, Austria), 2021
 French Resistance in Dry Lungs II (Placebo, USA), 1986
 Interview in mc Planeta (France), 1986
 Fear of Vacancy in Journey Into Pain (mc BST, Japan), 1986
 Don't Lock The Cage in Dry Lungs III (Placebo, USA), 1987
 L'hallali, avec Frank Royon Le Mée, Dominique Fonfrède, Martine Viard, Louis Hagen-William, L'Itinéraire, dir. Boris de Vinogradov, incl. opera-bouffe La Fosse (GRRR), 1987
 Sous les mers (GRRR), 1988
 Qui vive ? (GRRR), 1989
 Der Falsche Mann in Out of Depression (Germany)
 Le futur abyssal in Mouvements (La légende des voix, France), 1990
 Le K, text by Dino Buzzati with Richard Bohringer (GRRR, reissue Auvidis), Nomination at 9th Victoires de la Musique, 1990–93
 Pale Driver Killed By A Swallow On A Country Road in Dry Lungs IV (Subterranean Records, USA), 1991
 Le fond de l'âme effraie : Air Cut in Atomic Zen (Dedali Opera, Japan), 1991
 North Eating South Starving in A Gnomean Haigonaimean (Johnny Blue, Portugal), 1991
 Jeune fille qui tombe... tombe, text by Dino Buzzati with Daniel Laloux (In Situ, France), 1991
 Kind Lieder, nine songs which hurt (GRRR), 1991
 Rien ne va plus in Dry Lungs V (Subterranean Records, USA), 1992
 Utopie Standard in Passionnément (Visa, France), 1992
 Urgent Meeting, with Colette Magny, Didier Malherbe, Michel Godard, Louis Sclavis, Raymond Boni, Gérard Siracusa, Vinko Globokar, Yves Robert, François Tusques, Denis Colin... (GRRR/No Man’s land), 1992
 Opération Blow Up, with Brigitte Fontaine, Henri Texier, Luc Ferrari, Joëlle Léandre, Valentin Clastrier, René Lussier... (GRRR), 1992
 Musica Per Dimagrire in Musica Propiziatoria (Museo Immaginario, Italy), 1993
 Zappeurs-Pompiers 2 in Journal de bord (38e Rugissants, France), 1993
 Crasse-Tignasse, songs for children who like to be frightened (Auvidis, France), 1993
 3 pieces with Dee Dee Bridgewater and Balanescu String Quartet in Sarajevo Suite (L’empreinte digitale),1994
 ¡Vivan las utopias! in Buenaventura Durruti (nato, France), 1996
 L'instable and So Deep in L'étrange (CMG, France), 1998
 Machiavel (GRRR), with Benoît Delbecq, Steve Argüelles, DJ Nem, Philippe Deschepper..., 1998
 Wit in Enhanced Gravity (Yucca Tree, Germany), 1999
 Ça ira in Les Actualités, with singer Baco (Les Allumés du Jazz, France), 2006
 C'est le bouquet (unissued CD to be downloaded with Sextant magazine, GRRR), 2007
 Poils et plumes with writer Dominique Meens (GRRR), to be issued in 2022
 174 hours of unissued, freely downlable, music (91 albums, 1197 pieces) on drame.org, 2010-2023
 Fluxus +/- with Kommissar Hjuler, Mama Baer (Psych.KG, Germany), 2022

Live shows
 Long series of Poisons, 1976–79
 24 silent movies with live orchestra, 1977-99 : À propos de Nice (Jean Vigo), The Battleship Potemkin & Strike (Sergei Eisenstein), La glace à trois faces & La chute de la Maison Usher (Jean Epstein), Caligari (Robert Wiene), Nosferatu (F.W. Murnau), Waxworks (Paul Leni), Man with a Movie Camera (Dziga Vertov), The Passion of Joan of Arc (Carl Dreyer), Enfants à Paris (coll. Albert Kahn), Fantômas (5 episodes by Louis Feuillade) and Vampires, La vie de notre Seigneur Jésus Christ (C. Pathé), Mysterious X & Häxan (Benjamin Christensen), L'Argent (Marcel L'Herbier)...
 La rue, la musique et nous. Arcueil, 1979
 Rideau!, 1980
 Sound-art in Parc della Rimembranza. Napoli (Italy), 1981
 Pieces for orchestra, 1981–86
 Le trou, from Edgar Allan Poe, 1982
 Music for fire organ and orchestra, 1983
 Los Angeles Olympic Games (live with satellite projection, Festival d'Avignon), 1984
 La Bourse et la vie (Nouvel Orchestre Philharmonique de Radio France, dir.Yves Prin), 1984
 45 secondes départ arrêté & Féeries Jacobines (fireworks), 1984–85
 Ballet music for Jean Gaudin (Ecarlate), Karine Saporta (Manèges at Opéra de Paris, Le Coeur Métamorphosé at Théâtre de la Ville), Lulla Card... 1985-1989
 Jeune fille qui tombe... tombe by Dino Buzzati (oratorio, Michael Lonsdale / Daniel Laloux), 1985–90
 Le K by Dino Buzzati (oratorio, Michael Lonsdale / Richard Bohringer - Daniel Laloux, scenery R.Sarti), 1985–92
 La Fosse (opera-bouffe, Martine Viard, Louis Hagen-William, l'Itinéraire), 1987
 Le Chateau des Carpathes by Jules Verne (burning cantata, Frank Royon Le Mée), 1987
 20 000 lieues sous mers (magical show and imaginary museum on 2 boats, La Péniche Opéra), 1988
 Zappeurs-Pompiers 1 & 2 (live zapping on giant screen, Lulla Card, Éric Houzelot / Guy Pannequin), 1987–89
 J'accuse by Émile Zola (R.Bohringer, D.Fonfrède, Ahmed Madani, 70 musicians, dir.Jean-Luc Fillon, scenery Raymond Sarti), 1989
 Contrefaçons (orchestra, dir.J-L.Fillon), 1989
 Kind Lieder, 1991
 Let my children hear music by Charlie Mingus, 1992
 Crasse-Tignasse, show for children, 1993–94
 Machiavel (improvised techno with interactive images), 1999–2000
 Resurrection, 2014

Radio
 U.S.A. le complot & La peur du vide, France Musique, 1983
 Écarlate, France Culture, 1989

Video
 Antène 1, real. Emmanuelle K, 1983
 Auhourd'hui en France, real. Didier Ranz, 1987
 Le K, real. Ch. Gomila, 1989
 More than 20 links to films on Un d.m.i.

Bibliography
 {fr} A two pages self-portrait with Alain-René Hardy in Jazz magazine (January 1978 : 1 2)
 {fr} Stéphane Ollivier on Un d.m.i. in Vacarme (été 1997)
 {fr} A two pages blindfold with Stéphane Ollivier dans Jazz magazine (January 1999 : 1 2)

References

External links
Site of Un Drame Musical Instantané
on site Assez Vu

Avant-garde ensembles
20th-century classical composers
21st-century classical composers
French experimental music groups
20th-century French musicians